Club Sportivo Sergipe, or Sergipe as they are usually called, is a Brazilian football team from Aracaju, the second oldest club in the state of Sergipe, founded on October 17, 1909. Club Sportivo Sergipe is the only team from Sergipe to have played against foreign opposition, having faced the Argentina youth team, Sparta Prague, Alianza Lima and the Ghana national team.  Sergipe is the only team to have won six state championships in a row. Sergipe's main rival is Confiança. Sergipe's home field is the Estádio João Hora de Oliveira, capacity 8,000.

Sergipe is the third-best ranked team from the state in CBF's national club ranking, at 90th overall.

History
The club was founded on October 17, 1909, in Aracaju, by dissidents of Cotingüiba Esporte Clube. The latter club, named after the Cotinguiba River, had been founded on October 10, 1909, the first in Aracaju. The dissidents, including Adalberto Monteiro, Euclides Porto, Adalgiso Rosal, José Couto de Farias, Tancredo Campos, Américo Silva, Francisco Bessa and others, met at noon on October 11 in Commercial Association and decided the next Sunday to found Club Sportivo Sergipe. Sergipe was initially founded as a rowing club, and in January 1910 the first boat was baptized as Nereida. The first head office was in a garage on Ivo do Prado Avenue. Sergipe football club officially started in 1916. In 1972, Sergipe became the first club from Sergipe state to compete in the Campeonato Brasileiro Série A, finishing in 26th place.

Memorable victories

1-0 over Ceará state team in 1926;
4-2 over Botafogo–BA (Bahia state champions) in 1936;
3-1 over Alagoas state team in 1940;
8-2 over Vitória–BA in 1942;
2-0 over Bangu (Rio de Janeiro state champion) in 1967;
3-1 over Argentina youth team in 1968 (first match between local club and foreign team).

Titles

Football
 Campeonato Sergipano (Sergipe state championship): 1922, 1924, 1927, 1928, 1929, 1932, 1933, 1937, 1940, 1943, 1955, 1961, 1964, 1967, 1970, 1971, 1972, 1974, 1975, 1982, 1984, 1985, 1989, 1991, 1992, 1993, 1994, 1995, 1996, 1999, 2000, 2003, 2013, 2016, 2018;
 Start tournament: 1921, 1942, 1946, 1963;
 Centenary of Maceió tournament: 1939;
 Capital Champion: 1939, 1945, 1960;
 City of Aracaju Tournament: 1968. Participating clubs: Vitória, Confiança and Bonsucesso;
 Runner-up of Walter Passos Tournament in 1962. Participating clubs: Bahia (champion), Leônico and Portuguesa-RJ. All games were played in Fonte Nova Stadium, Salvador.

Sport Rowing
 Campeonato Sergipano: 1911, 1913, 1916, 1919, 1922, 1929, 1939,1940, 1941, 1942, 1943, 1944, 1946.

Logo
The team logo, composed of an anchor and two paddles is because the club, initially, was dedicated to the practice of nautical sports.

Ultras
Torcida Esquadrão Colorado
Torcida Gigante Rubro

References

External links
 Official Website 

Segipe
 
Association football clubs established in 1909
1909 establishments in Brazil